A fuel control unit is a control system for gas turbine engines.

Fundamentals of turbine engine control
Gas turbine engines are primarily controlled by the amount of fuel supplied to the combustion chambers. With this in mind we can say that, the very simplest fuel control for a turbine engine is a fuel valve operated by the pilot. Many pre-production models of early turbojet engines featured just that, but it was soon found that this kind of control was difficult and dangerous in actual use. Closing the valve too quickly while trying to reduce power output could cause a lean die-out, where the airflow through the engine blows the flame out of the combustion chamber and extinguishes it. Adding fuel too quickly to increase power can damage the turbines due to excessive heat, or the sudden rise in combustion chamber pressure may cause a compressor stall. Another danger of too much fuel is a rich blow-out, where soaking the fire with fuel displaces the oxygen and lowers the temperature enough to extinguish the flame. The excess fuel may then be heated on the hot tailpipe and ignite, possibly causing damage to the aircraft. For an aircraft engine, changes in airspeed or altitude cause changes in air speed and density through the engine, which would then have to be manually adjusted for by the pilot.

A fuel control unit attempts to solve those problems by acting as an intermediary between the operator's controls and the fuel valve. The operator has a power lever which only controls the engine's potential, not the actual fuel flow. The fuel control unit acts as a computer to determine the amount of fuel needed to deliver the power requested by the operator.

Types of fuel control units
Hydromechanical: A combination of a flyweight governor and several sensors including compressor discharge pressure, burner can pressure, and exhaust pipe pressure. In some cases the engine's fuel pump is integrated in to the fuel control.
Electronic engine control (EEC): An EEC is essentially a hydromechanical fuel control but with added electrical components to prevent overheating or overspeeding the engine. If the electrical part of the control should fail, an EEC will revert to a standard hydromechanical fuel control.
Full-authority digital engine control (FADEC): A digital computer which controls a servo-operated fuel valve. In this case the power lever is only electrically connected to the fuel control.

Manufacturers
Honeywell
Tarco Automation
Woodward

See also
Aircraft engine
Jet engine
Turbojet
Turbofan
Turboprop
Turboshaft

References

Engine fuel system technology